Jonathan Webster Cornett (10 March 1883 – 19 August 1973) was the 25th mayor of Vancouver, British Columbia from 1941 to 1946. He was born in Lansdowne, Ontario, moving to Vancouver in 1907.

"Jack" Cornett was the final reeve of South Vancouver before it was absorbed into Vancouver in 1929. His mayoral campaign included a patriotic theme at a time when Canada was involved with World War II.

Cornett was elected to the British Columbia Legislative Assembly as a British Columbia Conservative Party MLAs for South Vancouver in 1928 and served a term.

References

External links
Vancouver History: list of mayors, accessed 24 August 2006

1883 births
1973 deaths
Mayors of Vancouver
British Columbia Conservative Party MLAs
People from Leeds and Grenville United Counties
20th-century Canadian politicians